Estadio Bernabé Pedrozo is a multi-use stadium in Asunción, Paraguay.  It is currently used mostly for football matches and is the home stadium of Club Silvio Pettirossi of the Primera División de Paraguay.  The stadium holds 4,200 spectators.

External links
Stadium information

Multi-purpose stadiums in Paraguay
Football venues in Asunción
Sports venues in Asunción